Qidu District or Cidu District is a district of the city of Keelung, Taiwan. It borders New Taipei to the west.

History

During the period of Japanese rule,  included modern day Qidu and Nuannuan districts and was governed under  of Taihoku Prefecture.

In March 1988, the Keelung city government reassigned administration of several urban villages between districts. Ying-geh, Chi-sien, She-wei, San-min, Wu-fu and Liu-ho, originally part of Qidu District (Chi-du) became part of Anle District.

Administrative divisions
The district administers 20 urban villages:
 Changxing/Changsing/Zhangxing, Zhengguang/Jhengguang, Fumin, Yongping, Yongan/Yong-an/Yong'an, Bade, Ziqiang/Zihciang/Zijiang, Liudu/Lioudu, Taian/Tai-an/Tai'an, Dubei, Dunan, Manan, Madong/Matung, Maxi/Masi, Youyi, Youer/You-er, Zhengming/Jhengming, Baifu/Bofu, Shijian/Shihjian and Changan/Zhangan Village.

Tourist attractions

 Tai-an Falls
 Yo-Ruai Stream

Transportation

 TRA Baifu Station
 TRA Qidu Station

Notable natives
 Hsu Tsai-li, Mayor of Keelung City (2001–2007)
 Kao Chia-yu, member of Legislative Yuan

See also
 Keelung

References

External links

  

Districts of Keelung